Dokhaharan lake also known as Dokhaharoon lake (which means two sisters lake) is a lake located on western hillside of Mount Damavand. This name is because of nearby mounts, named Dokhaharan.

It is located in Larijan District, Amol County. Road 77 (Iran) passes by this lake.

Lake is located 3880 meters higher than sea level and its primary inflow is melted snows on the nearby mounts. This lake is not very deep.

See also
Alendan lake

References 

Lakes of Iran
Tourist attractions in Amol
Tourist attractions in Mazandaran Province